The Brazilian Fencing Confederation ( (CBE)) is the national organization responsible for managing and promoting the sport of fencing in Brazil. The CBE was founded in 1927 and is headquartered in Rio de Janeiro.

The CBE is affiliated with the International Fencing Federation. Its president is Gerli dos Santos, and its vice president is Ricardo Machado Pacheco.

External links

National members of the Panamerican Fencing Confederation
Fencing